Dieter Hochheimer (born 24 September 1952 in Hattersheim am Main) is a former German football player and manager.

Playing career 
Hochheimer played three games for the German U-16 in 1968, the year he moved to Kickers Offenbach. He also played a game in the under 19 youth national team in 1970. After four years at the Bieberer Berg, he was signed by Hamburger SV. However, in Hamburg, he was limited to just a handful of cup outings, having not made a league appearance in two seasons. In 1974, Hochheimer moved to 1. SC Göttingen 05 in the 2. Bundesliga-Nord where he made 73 appearances before transferring to Tennis Borussia Berlin. In West Berlin, he played 109 league games, including 17 in the Bundesliga. He played a further 93 games for VfL Osnabrück where he finished his playing career.

Coaching career 
After retiring, Hochheimer became the coach of the Edmonton Eagles in the Canadian Professional Soccer League and was head coach of the California Kickers until 1991.

References

External links 
 

1952 births
Living people
People from Main-Taunus-Kreis
Sportspeople from Darmstadt (region)
German footballers
Germany youth international footballers
Association football midfielders
Association football forwards
Bundesliga players
2. Bundesliga players
Kickers Offenbach players
Hamburger SV players
Tennis Borussia Berlin players
VfL Osnabrück players
German football managers
Footballers from Hesse